Akupara Games is an American video game publisher and developer. Based in Los Angeles, California, the company was founded in 2016 by David Logan. The company also does contracting work for development and porting to console and mobile platforms.

After the production of Logan's first title as a developer, Whispering Willows, Logan and his team moved into post-launch support.

Catalogue

References

External links 
 

Video game development companies
Video game companies of the United States
Video game publishers
Indie video game developers
American companies established in 2016
Video game companies established in 2016
Companies based in Los Angeles
2016 establishments in California